The history of Uzbek cinema can be divided into two periods: the cinema of Soviet Uzbekistan (1924–1991) and the cinema of independent Uzbekistan (1991–present).

History
A Cinematographic Department was created in 1920 in what was then the Turkestan Autonomous Soviet Socialist Republic, and in 1924 the first film studios were created in Bukhara as a cooperative enterprise between the Sevzapkino studio in Russia and the Commissariat of Enlightenment of the Bukharan People's Soviet Republic. Bukhkino, as a Russo-Bukharan cinematographic society, was also founded in 1924 and produced the first feature film in present-day Uzbekistan, The Minaret of Death by Viacheslav Viskovskii (1925), an exotic-themed film that was successful throughout the Soviet Union and was even exported abroad. Later, Bukhkino merged into Uzbekgoskino (Uzbekfilm) in Tashkent, which originally produced mostly Soviet anti-religious propaganda targeting Islam during the USSR anti-religious campaign (1928–1941).

Films of the Soviet period were shot either in Russian or Uzbek. The most critically acclaimed films of the Soviet period include films such as Maftuningman (1958), Mahallada duv-duv gap (1960), and Shum bola (1977).

Two prominent directors in the Soviet era were Nabi Ganiev (1904–1952) and Suleiman Khodjaev (1892–1937). While Ganiev, the first Uzbek director whose movies starred a majority of Uzbek actors (in previous films, most actors were Russian), engaged in Stalinist propaganda through his movies, and survived the purges, Khodjaev became a victim of Stalin's repression. His movie Before Dawn (1933) was ostensibly a criticism of Tsarist Russia, but depicting it as a colonial power, and the Uzbeks who opposed it as anti-colonial freedom fighters, made the authorities suspicious that Khodjaev was alluding to the Soviet Union. In 1937, The Oath by Aleksandr Ulos’stev-Garf was the first talking film produced in Uzebekistan. It also marked the end of an era as, during the Great Purge, very few new films were produced.

Uzbekfilm, established in 1925, is the largest and oldest film studio  in Uzbekistan. The Uzbekistan State Institute of Arts and Culture in Tashkent is the major film school.

Few Uzbek films after Uzbekistan became independent have achieved international notability. According to some Russian film critics around 2009, many of the modern Uzbek movies were cheap and of low quality.  They suggested that while the quantity of Uzbek films is going up, the quality was not. However, there have been several critically acclaimed films in recent years, such as Scorpion (2018), Hot Bread (2019), and  2000 Songs of Farida (2020). I’m not a terrorist (2021).

Uzbekistani film directors
Ayub Shahobiddinov
Shuhrat Abbosov
Melis Abzalov
Yoʻldosh Aʼzamov
Ali Hamroyev
Georgi Yungvald-Khilkevich
Yalkin Tuychiev
Muhammad Ali Iskandarov
 Jaxongir Ahmedov

Uzbekistan film actors

Uzbekistani actors and actresses include:

 Adiz Radjabov
 Azamat Axrorov
 Aziz Rametov
 Radjabova Azisa
Aleksandr Abdulov
Akmal Nazarov
 Baxtiyor Ixtiyorov 
 Bekzod Tadjiyev
 Botir Khusanbaev
 D.Ditto
Melis Abzalov
Shuhrat Abbosov
Yefim Bronfman
Shukur Burkhanov
Sitora Farmonova
Ali Hamroyev
Ergash Karimov
Dilnoza Kubayeva
Asal Shodiyeva
Tohir Sodiqov
Alisher Uzoqov
Jamshid Zokirov
Umid Iskandarov
 Ulugʻbek Qodirov
 Diyor Mahkamov
 Hoshim Arslonov
 Fatxulla Mansudov
 Yodgor Sadiyev
 Yoqub Ahmediv
 Rihsitilla Abdullaev
 Lufilla Sadullayeva
 Gulchexra Sadullayeva
 Murod Radjabov
 Mo'min Rizo
Muhammad Ali Iskandarov
Nodirbek Primqulov
 Guchehra Eshonqulova
 Umid Zokirov

List of Uzbekistan films

The following are selected critically acclaimed Uzbek films:
Maftuningman (1958)
 Yor-yor (1964) 
Mahallada duv-duv gap (1960)
Shum Bola (1977)
Toʻylar muborak  (1978)
Suyunchi (1982)
Kelinlar qoʻzgʻoloni (1984)
Armon (1986)
Abdullajon (1991)
Sarvinoz (2004)
Foyima va Zuxra (2005)
Telba (2008) 
Yondiradi Kuydiradi (2011)
Virus (2016)
 Scorpion (2018)
 Islomxoʻja (2018)
Hot Bread (2019)
 2000 Songs of Farida (2020)
 Ilhaq — (2020)
I’m not a terrorist (rus. ). (2021)

See also
 Cinema of Central Asia
 Cinema of the Soviet Union
 Cinema of the world
 List of Uzbekistani submissions for the Academy Award for Best International Feature Film

References